Nirbhaya is a mobile phone app provided by Uttar Pradesh Police (and the now the CM of Kerala too) in India that is designed to enhance the safety of women. It is currently available for Noida residents and is available in beta version as Nirbhaya@Noida: Be fearless!.

Uttar Pradesh Police plans to roll out the app across Uttar Pradesh in a phased manner. It is named after 2012 Delhi gang rape.

References

E-government in India
Law enforcement in Uttar Pradesh
Uttar Pradesh Police
Mobile phone industry in India
Security software
Women in Uttar Pradesh
2014 establishments in Uttar Pradesh
2014 software